Aviana Airways Ltd operating as Royal Bengal Airline was an airline that operated flights in Bangladesh. The carrier, headquartered in London, was wholly owned by R B Airline UK Ltd.

History
Royal Bengal Airlines was founded by members of Britain's Bangladeshi businessmen in June 2006 and officially launched to the public in November 2006. It is the first airline to be owned and run by British-born Bangladeshis from the Sylhet region of Bangladesh and will operate long haul routes between the United Kingdom and Bangladesh with stopovers in the Middle East.

The airline has been founded on the basis of providing direct flights to Osmani International Airport in Sylhet from the United Kingdom. The company slogan on the initial launch was "The Journey Begins Here". However, the Civil Aviation Authority of Bangladesh has yet to confirm that Royal Bengal Airlines (or any other airline) will be given access to this lucrative route.

By June 2007, the airline had raised GBP£5.5 million of investment from local businesses and stock brokers and had purchased two Dash 8-100 aircraft. Domestic services were expected to commence during summer 2007 with international flights from the UK expected by the end of 2007 from London Stansted, Manchester and Birmingham airports. 

The airline officially launched commercial operations on 31 January 2008 and later sold off.

Destinations
Royal Bengal Airline initially operated three domestic scheduled services a day, between Dhaka and Chittagong and between Dhaka and Sylhet. By September 2009, the service between Dhaka and Cox's Bazar had been added.

Fleet
Royal Bengal Airline operated the Bombardier Dash 8-102A medium range turboprop airliner seating 37 passengers.

References

Defunct airlines of Bangladesh
Airlines established in 2006
Bangladeshi companies established in 2006
2009 disestablishments in Bangladesh